Doubling may refer to:

Mathematics 
 Arithmetical doubling of a count or a measure, expressed as:
 Multiplication by 2
 Increase by 100%, i.e. one-hundred percent 
 Doubling the cube (i. e., hypothetical geometric construction of a cube with twice the volume of a given cube)
 Doubling time, the length of time required for a quantity to double in size or value
 Doubling map, a particular infinite two-dimensional geometrical construction
 see also: Period-doubling bifurcation

Music 
 The composition or performance of a melody with itself or itself transposed at a constant interval such as the octave, third, or sixth, Voicing (music)#Doubling
 The assignment of a melody to two instruments in an arrangement
 The playing of two (or more) instruments alternately by a single player, e.g. Flute, doubling piccolo
 Musicians who play more than one woodwind instrument are called Woodwind Doublers or Reed Players
 Doubletracking, a recording technique in which a musical part (or vocal) is recorded twice and mixed together, to strengthen or "fatten" the tone.

Other 
 Doubling (psychodrama) is a technique of provoking a protagonist by a participant, for effect.
 Doubling in the theatre is where one actor plays more than one part in the same performance.
 Doubling (textiles) is the process where six slivers of cotton are fed into a draw frame, stretched and drawn together to improve the uniformity of the roving before it is spun 
 Doubling (naval tactic) was a means of focusing gunfire in formations of sailing warships maneuvering as a line of battle.
 Double knitting is the process of combining two or more lengths of yarn into a single thread.
 Doubling in two-way radio, where two or more transmitters transmit at once on the same frequency, interfering with one another and garbling all messages.
 Syntactic doubling is a phenomenon consisting in the lengthening (gemination) of the initial consonant of certain words
 When more than one round is fired in a semiautomatic gas powered rifle with only one pull of the trigger, also known as a slam fire.
 Doubling trains tracks has two tracks for two direction traffic.

See also 
 Double (disambiguation)
 Dublin